Jon Freeman may refer to:
Jon Freeman (game designer), American game designer
Jon Freeman (academic), American psychologist